The 2015-16 Pro A is the 68th season of French League Volleyball. It is the highest level of volleyball competition for men in France. The French League Volleyball is sanctioned by Fédération Française de Volley-Ball

League Format
Classification
The classification round will use double round-robin format.  Each team plays the other 13 teams twice totaling the number of matches to 182 matches.
 Ranking
Points system will be used to determine the ranking of teams.
 Match won in 3–0 or 3–1: 3 match points for the winner; 0 match points for the loser
 Match won in 3–2: 2 match points for the winner; 1 match point for the loser
Succeeding tie-break criteria(in order):
 number of matches won
 Set ratio
 Point ratio
 Playoff
 At the end of classification round, Top eight teams continue to the playoff round.
 Teams ranked 9th to 11th are as is.
 Bottom three teams are relegated to Pro B League.
 Quarterfinals
 Best-of-three series
 1st vs 8th (QF1)
 2nd vs 7th (QF2)
 3rd vs 6th (QF3)
 4th vs 5th (QF4)
 The higher seed hosts first round; lower seed hosts second round.The higher seed hosts third round if necessary.
 Semifinals
 Best-of-three series
 QF1 winner vs QF4 winner
 QF2 winner vs QF3 winner
 The higher seed hosts first round; lower seed hosts second round.The higher seed hosts third round if necessary.
 Finals
 One-game series

Regular season

| Penalty: -3

|}

Playoffs

Quarterfinals

|}

|}

|}

|}

Semifinals

|}

|}

Finals

|}

Final Standing

External links
Ligue Nationale de Volley

National volleyball leagues
Volleyball competitions in France
Volleyball